Vincenzo Ludovico Gotti (5 September 1664 – 18 September 1742) was a Cardinal and theologian of the Roman Catholic Church.

Gotti was born in Bologna. Educated by Jesuits, he entered the Dominican Order at the age of sixteen. After studies in Salamanca in Spain, he was assigned to teach theology and philosophy at various schools of the Dominican Order.  In 1688 Gotti was professor of philosophy at the Dominican College of Saint Thomas, the future Pontifical University of Saint Thomas Aquinas, Angelicum.  He also taught in Mantua and Bologna.

In 1708, Gotti was elected Prior of the Dominican monastery in Bologna. On 30 April 1728 Pope Benedict XIII made him Cardinal Priest and appointed him Patriarch of Jerusalem.

Together with Charles René Billuart, Gotti was the leading proponent of the Thomistic school in his time. His writings include several polemics against Lutherans and Calvinism as well as commentaries on Thomas Aquinas.

Gotti was considered papabile (a serious contender to be elected Pope) at the Papal conclave of 1740, when Cardinal Lambertini said to the College of Cardinals "If you wish to elect a saint, choose Gotti; a statesman, Aldrovandi; an honest man, me".

Notes

External links

MacCaffrey, J.: History of the Catholic Church, Vol I, ch. 10; 1914.
Works available online:
Vera Ecclesia Christi signis, tom. 1
Vera Ecclesia Christi signis, tom. 2, part 1
Vera Ecclesia Christi signis, tom. 2, part 2
Vera Ecclesia Christi signis, tom. 3
Vera Ecclesia Christi signis, tom. 4, part 1
Vera Ecclesia Christi signis, tom. 4, part 2
Vera Ecclesia Christi signis, tom. 5
Vera Ecclesia Christi signis, tom. 6
Vera Ecclesia Christi signis, tom. 7, part 4

18th-century Italian cardinals
Latin Patriarchs of Jerusalem
Italian Dominicans
1664 births
1742 deaths